Sabalan is an  of the Islamic Republic of Iran Navy.

Commissioned in June 1972 as part of a four-ship order, the Sabalan was originally named IIS Rostam, after Rostam, a legendary hero in the Shahnameh. It was renamed after the Islamic revolution after Sabalan, the Iranian mountain.

Service history
During the Iran–Iraq War, the warship became infamous for attacks against the crews of unarmed and often neutral tankers and other merchant ships. Before these attacks, Sabalans captain would often board the ships and pretend to carry out a friendly inspection, sometimes even dining with the ship's master. Then he would open fire on the ship, sometimes aiming at the ship's bridge and living spaces. Often, the captain would radio his victims "Have a nice day" as Sabalan departed. These actions earned the captain the nickname "Captain Nasty".

Following the spillover of the conflict onto the Persian Gulf, the United States deployed warships in 1987 and 1988 to protect reflagged Kuwaiti shipping in the Persian Gulf. During the convoy operations, dubbed Operation Earnest Will, an Iranian mine severely damaged a U.S. frigate. U.S. forces mounted a one-day retaliation called Operation Praying Mantis.  The operation's objectives were to destroy two Iranian oil platforms used for drilling and attack coordination and one unspecified Iranian warship.

On the morning of April 18, 1988, the oil platforms were knocked out. The U.S. forces then turned to look for Iranian frigates in the Strait of Hormuz, which joins the Gulf of Oman and the Persian Gulf.  Sabalans sister frigate  was identified by aircraft from the aircraft carrier  and drawn into a fatal engagement. Another group of A-6 Intruders was sent to the reported location of Sabalan in the strait, where the Sabalan fired at the A-6s at 6.17 p.m. (Gulf time).

At 6.18 p.m., an A-6 dropped a Mk-82 500 pound laser-guided bomb, which left Sabalan paralyzed and on fire.  At the Pentagon, Defense Secretary Frank Carlucci, Chairman of the Joint Chiefs Adm. William J. Crowe Jr., and U.S. Central Command head Gen. George B. Crist monitored the situation.  After discussion, the men decided to spare the moribund Sabalan, perhaps to prevent further escalation.

Iranian forces towed the damaged ship to the port of Bandar Abbas, and it was eventually repaired and returned to service.

The mission was described by an Iranian admiral as a response to the ongoing presence of the United States Fifth Fleet, which is based in Bahrain, across the Persian Gulf. However, the trip to the Atlantic Ocean never happened and was called off in April 2014.

See also

 List of Imperial Iranian Navy vessels in 1979
 List of current ships of the Islamic Republic of Iran Navy

Notes

References

 (Describes Sabalan actions in 1988 from the viewpoint of a U.S. frigate operating in the Gulf.)

Alvand-class frigates
Ships built on the River Tyne
Ships built in Barrow-in-Furness
1969 ships
Frigates of Iran
Vickers
Iran–Iraq War naval ships of Iran
Frigates of the Cold War